is a railway station on the Hohi Main Line operated by JR Kyushu in Chūō-ku, Kumamoto, Japan.

Lines

Layout 
The station consists of an island platform serving two tracks at grade. The station building is integrated within a modern multi-storey building with many shops and commercial tenants as well as apartments on the upper floors. The station itself is located on level 2 and includes an enclosed waiting room and a staffed ticket window. A passageway leads to a flight of steps which connects to the island platform. The same passageway also serves to connect to a second entrance to the station serving the street on the other side of the tracks. There is also elevator access to the station from street level and from the station to the platform.

Management of the station has been outsourced to the JR Kyushu Tetsudou Eigyou Co., a wholly owned subsidiary of JR Kyushu specialising in station services. It staffs the ticket booth which is equipped with a  Midori no Madoguchi facility.

Adjacent stations

History
On the same day, this station was opened as one of several intermediate stations along the track. On 2 December 1928, the entire track from Kumamoto to Ōita was designated as the Hōhi Main Line. With the privatization of Japanese National Railways (JNR), the successor of JGR, on 1 April 1987, the station came under the control of JR Kyushu.

Passenger statistics
In fiscal 2016, the station was used by an average of 3,168 passengers daily (boarding passengers only), and it ranked 58th among the busiest stations of JR Kyushu.

Environs
Suizen-ji Jōju-en

See also
List of railway stations in Japan

References

External links
Suizenji (JR Kyushu)

Railway stations in Kumamoto Prefecture
Railway stations in Japan opened in 1914